Samuel Taylor Darling (April 6, 1872 in Harrison, New Jersey – May 21, 1925 in Beirut) was an American pathologist and bacteriologist who discovered the pathogen Histoplasma capsulatum in Panama in 1906. He died in Beirut in a car accident together with British malariologist Norman Lothian. The Darling Foundation prize for malaria research was established in his memory.

References

External links
 A website about Samuel Taylor Darling

1872 births
1925 deaths
American bacteriologists
American pathologists
People from Harrison, New Jersey